Apache Axis (Apache eXtensible Interaction System) is an open-source, XML based Web service framework. It consists of a Java and a C++ implementation of the SOAP server, and various utilities and APIs for generating and deploying Web service applications. Using Apache Axis, developers can create interoperable, distributed computing applications. Axis development takes place under the auspices of the Apache Software Foundation.

Axis for Java
When using the Java version of Axis there are two ways to expose Java code as Web service. The easiest one is to use Axis native JWS (Java Web Service) files.
Another way is to use custom deployment. Custom deployment enables you to customize resources that should be exposed as Web services.

See also Apache Axis2.

JWS Web service creation
JWS files contain Java class source code that should be exposed as Web service. The main difference between an ordinary java file and jws file is the file extension. Another difference is that jws files are deployed as source code and not compiled class files.

The following example will expose methods add and subtract of class Calculator.
 public class Calculator 
 {
   public int add(int i1, int i2) 
   {
     return i1 + i2; 
   }
 
   public int subtract(int i1, int i2) 
   {
     return i1 - i2;
   }
 }

JWS Web service deployment
Once the Axis servlet is deployed, you need only to copy the jws file to the Axis directory on the server. This will work if you are using an
Apache Tomcat container. In the case that you are using another web container, custom WAR archive creation will be required  .

JWS Web service access
JWS Web service is accessible using the URL http://localhost:8080/axis/Calculator.jws . If you are running a custom configuration of Apache Tomcat or a different container, the URL might be different.

Custom deployed Web service
Custom Web service deployment requires a specific deployment descriptor called WSDD (Web Service Deployment Descriptor) syntax. It can be used to specify resources that should be exposed as Web services. Current version (1.3) supports
 RPC services
 EJB - stateless (Enterprise Java Bean)

Automated generation of WSDL
When a Web service is exposed using Axis it will generate a WSDL file automatically when accessing the Web service URL with ?WSDL appended to it.

Related technologies
 Apache Axis2 - re-design/write of Axis
 Java Web Services Development Pack - web services framework
 Apache CXF - other Apache web services framework (old XFire & Celtix)
 XML Interface for Network Services - RPC/web services framework
 Web Services Invocation Framework - Java API for invoking Web services
 webMethods Glue - commercial web services enabling product

References

External links
 Apache Axis Homepage at the Apache Software Foundation

Axis
Web services
Web service specifications